HMS Southampton was a batch two Type 42 destroyer of the Royal Navy. She was named after the city of Southampton, England, and built by Vosper Thornycroft, in Southampton. She was the sixth Royal Navy ship to bear the name.

Operational service

1981–2005
In 1982, Southampton ran over one of the Shambles Buoys off Portland during the final Thursday War intended to prepare her to deploy to the Falklands. The collision sank the buoy and resulted in a period in dry dock for repair.

On 3 September 1988, whilst serving on the Armilla Patrol, she was involved in a collision with MV Tor Bay, a container ship in the convoy being escorted through the Straits of Hormuz. Three members of her crew were slightly injured and a  hole torn in Southamptons hull. The destroyer was returned to the UK aboard a semi-submersible heavy lift ship.

2006–2011

Fate
On 31 July 2008, Southampton was placed in a state of "Extended Readiness" and was decommissioned on 12 February 2009. The ship was auctioned on 28 March 2011 and was later towed from Portsmouth on 14 October 2011 to Leyal Ship Recycling's scrapyard in Aliağa, Turkey.

Affiliations
The Princess of Wales's Royal Regiment (Queen's and Royal Hampshires)
No. 25 Squadron RAF
City of Southampton
Worshipful Company of Fletchers
Lord Lieutenant of Hampshire
Canford School Combined Cadet Force
Mill Hill School
Old Southamptons (veterans of the previous HMS Southampton)
Royal Southampton Yacht Club
Southampton and Fareham Chamber of Commerce and Industry
Southampton University Royal Naval Unit
TS Southampton (Sea Cadet Corps)
Royal Naval Association Southampton
Southampton RN Officers Association

References

External links

 Royal Navy website: HMS Southampton

 

Ships built in Southampton
Cold War destroyers of the United Kingdom
1979 ships
Type 42 destroyers of the Royal Navy
Non-combat naval accidents